New Empire, Vol. 2 is the seventh studio album by American rap rock band Hollywood Undead. It was released on December 4, 2020 through Dove & Grenade Media and BMG and was produced by Matt Good. The album is the follow-up to the group's sixth album, New Empire, Vol. 1 (2020).

Background and promotion
On July 31, the band released the first single titled "Idol" featuring Tech N9ne from the unannounced official follow-up to New Empire, Vol. 1. On September 18, the band released the second single "Coming Home".

On October 16, 2020, the band released the third single and remix version of the song "Heart of a Champion" featuring Jacoby Shaddix of Papa Roach and Spencer Charnas of Ice Nine Kills along with an accompanying music video. At the same time, the band announced the album itself, the album cover, the track list, and release date. On November 13, three weeks before the album release, the band released the fourth and final single of the album "Gonna Be OK".

A Red-and-Yellow Color Vinyl version of the album is available at Tower Records website.

Critical reception

The album received mostly positive reviews, but also mixed reviews from several critics. Carlos Zelaya from Dead Press! rated the album positively calling it: "With New Empire, Vol. 2, Hollywood Undead won't exactly convert a new audience, but they will satisfy their existing fanbase. Continuing to grow their sound and embrace the hip-hop styles that they've invariably influenced, Hollywood Undead close out the year with an ambitious and revitalised approach to their sound." Distorted Sound scored the album 5 out of 10 and said: "It was honestly surprising to hear a mostly lifeless album emerge from a group as full of piss and vinegar as HOLLYWOOD UNDEAD is. Credit is due to the band for attempting to get involved with the times and recognising what is popular now, but the execution leaves much to be desired. It's time to regroup and re-plan the strategy for the next record. They're sniffing out the right track, but they have some thinking to do when the artists they want to join go much harder lyrically and musically than they do."

Writing for Kerrang!, Jake Richardson gave the album an overall positive review, saying: "If you've never liked this band, then there's little here that's likely to convert you, but for those already on board, New Empire, Vol. 2 is a more than satisfying confirmation that, a decade-and-a-half after they started, Hollywood Undead still have something to offer." James Holder of Rock Sins rated the album 7 out of 10 and said: "New Empire, Vol. 2 is Hollywood Undead just as they've always been, and that's just the way they like it."

Track listing

Personnel
Credits adapted from AllMusic.

Hollywood Undead
 Jorel "J-Dog" Decker – vocals, guitars, bass, keyboards, programming, composition
 Dylan "Funny Man" Alvarez – vocals, composition
 George "Johnny 3 Tears" Ragan – vocals, bass, composition
 Jordon "Charlie Scene" Terrell – vocals, guitars, composition, production
 Daniel "Danny" Murillo – vocals, keyboards, programming, guitars, bass, composition

Additional musicians
 Hyro the Hero – guest vocals on track 2, composition
 Killstation – guest vocals on track 5
 Tech N9ne – guest vocals on track 6, composition
 Jacoby Shaddix of Papa Roach – guest vocals on track 10
 Spencer Charnas of Ice Nine Kills – guest vocals on track 10
 Ghøstkid – guest vocals on track 11
 Kurt92 – guest vocals on track 12
 Luke Holland – drums

Additional personnel
 Matt Good – production, engineering, mastering, mixing, composition
 Ted Jensen – engineering
 Ian Dietrich, Chris Nilsson and Andrew Purcell – management
 Darren Craig – art direction
 Randall Leddy – layout

References

2020 albums
Hollywood Undead albums